Zhonghe is the name of several places in mainland China and Taiwan. It may refer to:

Zhonghe 
 Zhonghe Festival, a traditional Chinese festival
 Zhonghe District, district of New Taipei City, Taiwan
 Zhonghe Subdistrict, Shuangliu District, Sichuan
 Towns named Zhonghe
 Zhonghe, Chongqing, in Kaizhou District, Chongqing
 Zhonghe, Xiuyan County, in Xiushan Tujia and Miao Autonomous County, Chongqing
 Zhonghe, Danzhou, in Binhai District, Danzhou, Hainan
 Zhonghe, Qinggang County, in Qinggang County, Heilongjiang
 Zhonghe, Yanshou County, in Yanshou County, Heilongjiang
 Zhonghe, Huojia County, in Huojia County, Henan
 Zhonghe, Liuyang, Hunan
 Zhonghe, Ningyuan County, in Ningyuan County, Hunan
 Zhonghe, Meihekou, in Meihekou, Jilin
 Zhonghe, Sandu County, in Sandu Sui Autonomous County, Guizhou
 Zhonghe, Yuechi County, in Yuechi County, Sichuan
 Zhonghe, Ziyang, in Ziyang, Sichuan
 Zhonghe Township (中和乡)
 Zhonghe Township, Nanning, in Yongning District, Nanning, Guangxi
 Zhonghe Township, Dazhu County, in Dazhu County, Dazhou, Sichuan

Zhonghe 

 Zhonghe, Gaolan County, in Gaolan County, Lanzhou